Rawlinna Station is a pastoral lease and sheep station located about  east of Kambalda in the Goldfields-Esperance region  of Western Australia. The locality of Rawlinna and the Trans-Australian Railway are situated along the boundary of the station.

Description
It is owned by the Jumbuck Pastoral Company. The station encompasses part of the Nullarbor Plain, so the geology changes from the red dirt of the goldfields to the plain's famous white limestone outcrops. The vegetation changes from woodlands to the east to drought-resistant shrubs and grasses on the plain. 

A separate  block adjoins the fence that is also dog proofed with a solar powered electric fence. Stock are watered from 37 bores in 87 main paddocks, along with other holding paddocks.

A huge shearing complex, known as the Depot Outstation, was built in the middle of the property in 1967. The outstation has a 16-stand shearing shed, an overseer's house, shearers' and station hands' accommodation, mess and kitchen facilities.

History
The traditional owners of the land are the Mirning, Ngalea and Wangai peoples, who have inhabited the area for over 10,000 years.

John Eyre and his companion Wylie passed through the area as they crossed the Nullarbor in the expedition of 1841. Eyre commented that the Nullarbor was "a blot on the face of nature".

Established in 1962 by Hugh G. MacLachlan, of the South Australian pastoral family, the station has a short history compared to other properties of its type around Australia.
 
Through the late 20th century the area proved to be prime pastoral and breeding country when seasonal conditions were good. In those days the station held between 40,000 and 60,000 sheep, and annually produced 1100 to 1700 bales of wool.
 
In 2001, an amount of 78,417 sheep were shorn for 2177 bales of wool.
In 2014 around 53,000 sheep were shorn and 1285 bales of wool.

By 2006 things had improved, with  falling before the onset of winter, guaranteeing that winter grasses would germinate and stock of 32,000 sheep on the property at that stage would have adequate feed.

Ross Wood, the station manager, retired in 2007. Wood was the third manager employed at Rawlinna since 1967, the other two being David Seaton and Murray McQuie. The station manager in 2012 was Michael Simons, who had replaced Wood in 2007. Simons started with Jumbuck in 1983 and now runs Rawlinna along with 14 staff. The property is stocked with approximately 60,000 sheep, with wool being sent to Adelaide for testing and sale. The record number of sheep shorn at Rawlinna is 80,000.

See also
List of ranches and stations
List of the largest stations in Australia

References

Further reading

External links

Pastoral leases in Western Australia
Goldfields-Esperance
Stations (Australian agriculture)
Nullarbor Plain
1962 establishments in Australia